1778 in sports describes the year's events in world sport.

Boxing
Events
 June — Harry Sellers defeated Bill " The Nailer " Stevens in a 10 minute fight to retain the English Championship title.

Cricket
Events
 Thomas Brett, the first great Hambledon bowler, retired from cricket.
England
 Most runs – William Yalden 162
 Most wickets – Lamborn 22

Horse racing
England
 St Leger Stakes – Hollandoise

References

 
1778